MTV Thailand was a 24-hour music and entertainment channel owned by Paramount Networks EMEAA, a division of Paramount Global. This channel broadcasts both Thai and international music programs as well as a youth lifestyle T.V. series. The channel ended its transmission in 2011. In 2013, Viacom International Media Networks (VIMN), intended to bring back MTV Thailand with supports from AppleTool Co and MCOT Plc. On 1 September 2013, MTV Thailand officially returned to TrueVisions, replacing Channel V Thailand, before moving to CTH in January 2016.

VJs

 John Delcastillo (John)
 Angie Hastings (Gie)
 Rowena Kennet (Row)
 Nattapol Liyavanija (Tye)
 Oz
 Janesuda Parnto (Jane)
 Suppakarn Pordpai (Jay)
 Alexandra Sawaetwong (Alex)
 Sean
 Jane Sriprayul (Waaw)
 Annie Supsermsri (Annie)
 Poomjai Tangsanga (Poom)
 Garanick Tongpiam (Nicky)
 Michele Waagaard (Chele)
 Woody

MTV Thailand highlights of the month 
 Arert Altist
 Artist Focus
 Artist of the Month
 Buzzworthy
 Hot
 MTV This Is

Shows

MTV on FreeTV 

MTV News is presented in Thai language on TITV (free TV). It was first aired on November 2, 2007, Friday night, 00.30-01.00. MTV News is presented by VJ Nicky VJ Poom and VJ Waew.
 Headrines
 Local Stories
 Oversea Reports
 MTV News is aired every Friday night at 00.30-01.00

Note: MTV News is currently unavailable after TITV has been suspended and replaced by TPBS (Thailand Public Broadcasting Service).

MTV School Attack is performed surprise by Thai pop star at school. It is aired every Thursday at 17.05-17.30 on TV5. It is presented by VJ Poom and VJ Jay.

Trivia
 MTV Thailand was already one of the host country when MTV Asia Awards was held twice except in 2005 when the 2004 Asian tsunami happened.

References

External links
 MTV Thailand's official website
 MTV Asia

MTV channels
Television stations in Thailand
Television channels and stations established in 2001
2001 establishments in Thailand
Music organizations based in Thailand